Constructed around 1839, the Carpenter-Smith House  is located on Covered Bridge Road near Crestwood in Oldham County, Kentucky, United States. It was added to the National Register of Historic Places on February 25, 1982.  A photo of the house is included on page 16 of the April 2009 Brownsboro, Kentucky Area Master Plan.

It is somewhat unusual for having two separated front doors, in a window-door-window-door-window line-up of bays across the front of the house.
It is about 1/4 mile off Hwy

References

National Register of Historic Places in Oldham County, Kentucky
Houses completed in 1839
Houses in Oldham County, Kentucky
Houses on the National Register of Historic Places in Kentucky
1839 establishments in Kentucky